Melittia laboissierei is a moth of the family Sesiidae. It is known from Uganda.

References

Sesiidae
Moths described in 1917